Donuca castalia, the brown white banded noctuid, is a moth of the family Noctuidae. The species was first described by Johan Christian Fabricius in 1775. It is found in Queensland.

The wingspan is about 60 mm.

References

Catocalina